The Barrington Tops National Park is a protected national park located in the Hunter Valley in New South Wales, Australia. Gazetted in 1969, the  park is situated between Scone, Singleton, Dungog, Gloucester and East Gresford.

The park is part of the Barrington Tops group World Heritage Site Gondwana Rainforests of Australia inscribed in 1986 and added to the Australian National Heritage List in 2007.

It is also part of the Barrington Tops and Gloucester Tops Important Bird Area.

Environment

Geology
Barrington Tops is part of the Mount Royal Range, a spur of the Great Dividing Range. Barrington Tops is a plateau between two of the large peaks in the range. The park is believed to be an extinct volcano and the mountain ranges are made up of a mixture of sedimentary rocks with a granite top. Erosion has weathered the granite and rounded granite boulders can be seen in some areas of the park. Estimates put the age of the rock at 300 to 400 million years, well before Australia separated from Gondwana.

Climate

The climate varies from temperate on the lower altitudes to subalpine at highest elevations.

Flora
The ecology of the national park varies from subtropical rainforests in the gullies to subalpine and alpine regions on the mountain peaks. Snow usually falls on the mountain peaks every year and occasionally snows enough to close roads.

A large variety of plants and animals reside in the park and the steepness of the terrain ensures that they are not disturbed by humans. Plant life includes a large variety of eucalypt trees including Snow Gums, subtropical and temperate rainforest trees like Antarctic beech, tree ferns, a large variety of mosses and ferns and a wide range of edible plants such as the native raspberry, the native cherry and the lilli pilli.

Fauna

The remoteness and inaccessibility of a large part of the park has allowed some of the more sensitive animals to remain largely undisturbed. A large number of fauna have been catalogued in the park. Some of the more common animals include: barking and sooty owls, eastern grey kangaroos, frogs, pademelons, cockatoos, rosellas, kookaburras, bats and echidnas.  It supports a globally important population of rufous scrub-birds, as well as flame robins, pale-yellow robins, paradise riflebirds, green catbirds, regent bowerbirds and Australian logrunners.

Animals such as quolls, native rodents and platypus are reclusive, but may be seen. Not all of the animals in the park are desirable; introduced species such as feral horses, deer, feral dogs feral pigs, feral goats, foxes, and feral cats are planned to be removed.

History
The traditional owners of the area are Aboriginal Australian peoples, including the Gringai people (southern valleys), the Wonnarua people (western country), and the Worimi and Birpai people (the eastern side).

National Park and World Heritage Area
In 1969 the area between Mount Barrington, Mount Royal and the Gloucester Tops was declared the Barrington Tops National Park. In 1986 it was listed as a World Heritage Area and subsequently a Wilderness Area. Some of the rivers flowing through the Barrington range have been classed as wild rivers meaning they are exceptionally pure and unpolluted.

Aircraft crashes
A number of aircraft have crashed in and around the Barrington Tops, Aeroplane Hill being named after one of the crashes. The altitude, frequent fog & cloud, storms and cold weather (causing icing) make this area potentially hazardous to aircraft. One article refers to the "Devil's Triangle".
16 April 1945 – De Havilland Mosquito A52-70. Wreckage found January 1946 in the national park.
The propeller, ailerons and machine gun were on display at the Barrington Tops Guest House.
2 September 1948 – Australian National Airlines Douglas DC-3 VH-ANK. 13 killed.
25 September 1967 – RAAF Mirage III-O A3-52. Pilot ejected safely. The ejection seat was later recovered and is on display at Fighter World aviation heritage centre.
14 September 1969 – Lockheed Hudson VH-SML crashed in the foothills. 3 killed.
9 August 1981 – Cessna 210 VH-MDX. 5 killed, multiple searches have not found wreckage or bodies.
3 August 1987 – Aermacchi MB-326H A7-079 (built as CA30-79). Crew ejected. Wreckage located by bushwalkers 28 April 1995.
Photo of crew being rescued from a tree.

Barrington Guest House

The Barrington Guest House was built from 1925 on the upper Williams River near Barrington Tops by Norman T. McLeod, licensee of the Royal Hotel in Dungog, using timber cut and milled from the property. During the opening there was some 200 guests that attended.

The guest house was a popular venue for people to stay in the park, until it burned down in a fire at 11pm on 24 September 2006 due to an electrical fault. The fire was not regarded as suspicious. It was undergoing modernisation under new ownership at the time of the fire. There are plans to rebuild, but no significant process has been made, and only part of the old chimney remains on the site.  The guest house has undergone many different owners in its history; Mattara Investments that traded as Barrington Guest House and bought the premises in 1976. Due to business troubles however, it was then placed into voluntary administration in 2000, after which the business was than taken over by David and Susan Eissa in February 2002. Only one more owner has been known since (according to the now defunct website); Purchased in January 2004 by Natalie Day and Tony Horley.

Access
Barrington Tops is a popular weekend destination from Sydney and Newcastle. Numerous walking trails and camping grounds are scattered throughout the park. The park also contains well marked and well-maintained gravel roads as well as specific 4WD tracks into less travelled areas. General sightseeing can be accomplished in a non-offroad vehicle. As well as camping facilities, the nearby towns of Gloucester and Dungog have many places to stay.  The park is maintained by the NSW National Parks & Wildlife Service and rangers patrol the park daily.

See also

 Barrington Tops State Conservation Area
 Careys Peak
 List of mountains in New South Wales
 Mount Royal Range
 Protected areas of New South Wales

References

External links 

 
 NSW National Parks and Wildlife Service
 Barrington Tops Tourism Website
 Barrington Guest House

National parks of the Hunter Region
Volcanoes of New South Wales
Dungog Shire
Protected areas established in 1969
Gondwana Rainforests of Australia
Forests of New South Wales
1969 establishments in Australia
Important Bird Areas of New South Wales
Plateaus of Australia
Barrington Tops
Hunter River (New South Wales)
Sclerophyll forests